Hazleton Area High School (HAHS) is a public high school located in Hazle Township, Pennsylvania and is part of the Hazleton Area School District. According to the National Center for Education Statistics, the school reported an enrollment of 3,600 pupils in 2021.

History
During the period of 1966 and 1992, Hazleton Area School District closed all of its high schools except for Hazleton Area, Freeland, and West Hazleton High Schools. The Hazleton Area High School opened at 1601 West 23rd Street beginning in the 1992–1993 school year, which resulted in the complete consolidation of all remaining area high schools.

Athletics

Boys
Baseball - AAAAAA
Basketball - AAAAAA
Bowling - AAAAAA
Cross Country - AAA
Football - AAAAAA
Golf - AAA
Soccer - AAAA
Swimming and Diving- AAA
Tennis - AAA
Track and Field - AAA
Volleyball - AAA
Water Polo - AAAA
Wrestling - AAA
Total Boys Varsity Sports : 13

Girls
Basketball - AAAAAA
Bowling - AAAAAA
Cross Country- AAA
Field Hockey - AAA
Lacrosse - AAA
Soccer - AAAA
Softball - AAAAAA
Swimming and Diving - AAA
Tennis - AAA
Track and Field - AAA
Volleyball - AAAA
Water Polo - AAAA
Golf - AAA
Total Girls Varsity Sports : 13

Notable alumni
Lou Barletta, former U.S. Congressman
Nate Eachus, former professional football player, Kansas City Chiefs
Norm Larker, former professional baseball player, Los Angeles Dodgers and Milwaukee Brewers
John Yaccino, former professional football player, Buffalo Bills

References

External links

Official website

Public high schools in Pennsylvania
Schools in Luzerne County, Pennsylvania